Gao Yunxiang (born 15 August 1982),also known as Gavin Gao, is a Chinese actor best known for his roles as Yang Rui and Zhai Li in the television series Goddess of Mercy (2011) and Legend of Mi Yue (2015) respectively.

Early life and education
Gao was born in Tianjin on August 15, 1982. He was a football player before he was 15 years old. Then he has made a crossover from sports to the entertainment. He graduated from Shanghai Theatre Academy.

Acting career
Gao first screen acting credit was Ambition (2002) and subsequently appearing on television series such as Ordinary Life (2003), Watching Sunshine (2004), and A Beautiful New World (2005).

In 2005, he played a supporting role in Wind and Rain in Xiguan, starring Chen Kun and Sun Li and directed by Xu Geng.

Gao made his film debut in My Belle Boss (2007), a romantic comedy film starring Jing Tian and Peter Ho.

In 2008, Gao starred with Tiffany Tang and Zhang Yishan in  Born After 80.

In 2009, he has appeared in four television series: Percussion Lane, Love Is Past, Late Marriage, and Nanny Mother.

For his role as Yang Rui in Goddess of Mercy, Gao won the Best TV Actor: Legend at the 6th Huading Awards.

In 2013, he had a supporting role in Legend of Lu Zhen, a historical television series starring Zanilia Zhao as the lead actress.

In 2014, Gao has appeared in a number of television productions. He co-starred with Anita Yuen and Alex Man in Royal Romance as Shunzhi Emperor.  He played the title role in Palace 3: The Lost Daughter, co-starring Lu Yi, Mabel Yuan and Shirley Dai.

Gao earned his second Huading Award for his performance as Zhai Li in Legend of Mi Yue (2015). That same year, he was cast as Erlang Shen (Yang Jian) in Ne Zha and Yang Jian, opposite Wong Cho-lam, Law Kar-ying and Ying Er.

Personal life
Gao began dating Dong Xuan in 2009. They married in Beijing on August 21, 2011. Their daughter, nicknamed Xiao Jiuwo, was born on June 2, 2016. On July 16, 2019, Dong's attorney told reporter of Sina that Dong Xuan and Gao Yunxiang divorced in March 2019.

Sexual assault allegation
On March 29, 2018, Gao, together with the Chinese producer Wang Jing, was arrested in Sydney, Australia, after a woman accused them of sexually assaulting her three days before in the Shangri-La Hotel. He was in Sydney to shoot the TV series Love in Aranya. In June, he was released on a A$3 million bail.

Filmography

Film

Television

Film and TV Awards

References

External links

 Gao Yunxiang

1982 births
Living people
Shanghai Theatre Academy alumni
Chinese male film actors
Chinese male television actors
Male actors from Tianjin
21st-century Chinese male actors